Haydn Valentine Fleming (born 14 March 1978) is an English former professional footballer. He made over 30 appearances in the Football League for Cardiff City and played for several clubs in the Welsh Premier League.

Career
Fleming began his career as a youth player with Queens Park Rangers but was released by the club without making an appearance. He later joined Cardiff City and made his professional debut for the club in a 0–0 draw with Plymouth Argyle on 4 November 1995 and played 25 times in his debut season at Ninian Park. During the following season, he joined Welsh Premier League side Inter CableTel on loan but suffered a serious knee injury at the club and he returned to Cardiff where he was eventually released. He later went on to make over 100 appearances in the Welsh Premier League, most notably with Aberystwyth Town and Port Talbot Town.

Personal life
Fleming also works as a personal trainer.

References

External links

1978 births
Living people
English footballers
Cardiff City F.C. players
Inter Cardiff F.C. players
Merthyr Tydfil F.C. players
Aberystwyth Town F.C. players
Port Talbot Town F.C. players
Llanelli Town A.F.C. players
Cwmbrân Town A.F.C. players
Dinas Powys F.C. players
Carmarthen Town A.F.C. players
English Football League players
Cymru Premier players
Association football defenders
Taff's Well A.F.C. players